Miguel Colmeiro y Penido (1816–1901) was a Spanish botanist, and member of the Spanish Royal Academy of Sciences (Real Academia de Ciencias Exactas, Físicas y Naturales) .

Biography 
Miguel Colmeiro y Penido was born on 22 October 1816 in Santiago de Compostela. He was the rector of the Faculty of Sciences in the Complutense University of Madrid where he later became the Dean. He had been the Director of the Real Jardín Botánico de Madrid, and professor of Phytography and Botanical Geography. He also was a member of the Spanish Royal Academy of Sciences and of the Real Academia Nacional de Medicina de España.

He is known as the author of many notable botanical works. He was one of the founder of the Real Sociedad Española de Historia Natural. He received the Knight Grand Cross of the Civil Order of María Victoria. He died in Madrid on 21 June 1901.

Honors 
Eponymous

 ( Asteraceae ) Cirsium colmeiroanum
 ( Asteraceae ) Hieracium colmeiroanum
 ( Malvaceae ) Malva colmeiroi
 ( Oleaceae ) Phillyrea × colmeiroana
 ( Rhamnaceae ) Rhamnus × colmeiroi

Works 

 "Exámen de las encinas y demas árboles de la Península que producen bellotas : con la designacion de los que se llaman mestos" by Colmeiro, Miguel, 1816-1901; Geofrin, José María; Boutelou, Esteban
 "La botánica y los botánicos de la Peninsula Hispano-Lusitana : estudios bibliográficos y biográficos" 1858
 "Enumeración y revisión de las plantas de la península hispano-lusitana e Islas Baleares" 1886-89.

References 

19th-century Spanish botanists
1816 births
1901 deaths
Academic staff of the Complutense University of Madrid
People from Santiago de Compostela